Current Township is an inactive township in Dent County, in the U.S. state of Missouri.

Current Township was established in 1866, taking its name from the Current River.

References

Townships in Missouri
Townships in Dent County, Missouri